Pho Thong is a district (amphoe) in the northern part of Ang Thong province, central Thailand.

History
The district was established in 1890, at that time named Huai Ling Tok. Later the district name was changed to Pho Thong.

Geography
Neighboring districts are (from the north clockwise): Sawaeng Ha of Ang Thong Province; Tha Chang and Phrom Buri of Sing Buri province; Chaiyo, Mueang Ang Thong, Wiset Chai Chan and Samko of Ang Thong Province; and Si Prachan of Suphanburi province.

Administration
The district is divided into 15 sub-districts (tambons). There are two townships (thesaban tambons). Pho Thong covers parts of tambons Ang Kaeo, Inthapramun, and Bang Phlap, and Ram Masak covers parts of tambon Ram Masak.

Pho Thong